Drillia macleani is a species of sea snail, a marine gastropod mollusk in the family Drilliidae.

Description
The size of an adult shell varies between 10 mm and 17 mm.

Distribution
This species is found in the demersal zone of the Pacific Ocean off Isla Santa Cruz, Galápagos Islands, and in the Caribbean Sea off Cocos Island, Costa Rica.

References

 Tucker, J.K. 2004 Catalog of recent and fossil turrids (Mollusca: Gastropoda). Zootaxa 682:1–1295.

External links
 

macleani
Gastropods described in 1992